The 1982 Cal State Fullerton Titans baseball team represented California State University, Fullerton in the 1982 NCAA Division I baseball season. The Titans played their home games at Titan Field, and played as part of the Southern California Baseball Association. The team was coached by Augie Garrido in his tenth season as head coach at Cal State Fullerton.

The Titans reached the College World Series, their third appearance in Omaha, where they finished tied for seventh place after losing games to eventual runner-up Wichita State and third place .

Personnel

Roster

Coaches

Schedule and results

References

Cal State Fullerton Titans baseball seasons
Cal State Fullerton Titans
College World Series seasons
Cal State Fullerton Titans baseball